Shouldn't a Told You That is the third studio album by American country band Dixie Chicks, under the name the Dixie Chicks Cowgirl Band, released in 1993. It was their third and final album for the Crystal Clear Sound label, and last to feature singer-bassist Laura Lynch. Five years later, Natalie Maines joined, and the group released their 1998 breakthrough album Wide Open Spaces.

The title track, "Shouldn't a Told You That", was written by Walter Hyatt of the Austin cult band, Uncle Walt's Band. The track "There Goes My Dream" was previously recorded by Mark Collie for his album Born & Raised in Black & White in 1991.

Track listing
"Whistles and Bells" (Cindy Bullens, Radney Foster) - 3:01
"I'm Falling Again" (Matthew Benjamin, Martie Erwin, Laura Lynch, Emily Erwin) - 3:25
"Shouldn't a Told You That" (Walter Hyatt) - 3:05
"Desire" (Steve Kolander, Kim Richey) - 3:30
"There Goes My Dream" (Jamie O'Hara) - 3:32
"One Heart Away" (Benjamin, Tom Van Schaik) - 3:35
"The Thrill Is in the Chase" (Lynch, Dave Peters) - 3:09
"I Wasn't Looking for You" (Benjamin) - 3:28
"I've Only Got Myself to Blame" (Tony Lane) - 3:22
"Planet of Love" (Jim Lauderdale, John Leventhal) - 5:00
 Includes hidden track, "Boo Hoo"

Personnel
Martie Erwin - fiddle, vocals, harmony vocals
Laura Lynch - bass, vocals, harmony vocals
Emily Erwin - banjo, bass, Dobro, guitar, harmony vocals

Additional personnel
Matthew Benjamin - acoustic guitar, electric guitar
Joan Besen - piano
Steve Fishell - Dobro, electric guitar
Bob Gentry - bass
Lloyd Maines - steel guitar
Harry Stinson - harmony vocals
Tom Van Schaik - percussion, drums

Production
Producer: Steve Fishell
Engineer: Mike Poole

The Chicks albums
1993 albums